"Dog & Butterfly" is a song recorded by the rock band Heart.  It is the title track to the band's fourth studio album Dog & Butterfly and was released as the album's second single.

Description and origin
The song is a more subdued effort from the band, differing from past hard rock-oriented hits, as Ann and Nancy Wilson pulled from their folk music influences.  The song charted moderately in the US in 1979, peaking at #34 on the Billboard Hot 100.

Ann has said she was inspired when she looked out a window and saw a dog relentlessly chasing a butterfly. She saw the song as an inspiration when things get tough to "keep going after it."

Cash Box called it a "gentle acoustic ballad which rides a melodic verse and acoustic guitar and easy beat backing." Record World called it a "a light romantic ballad that should suit adult and pop playlists."

Although it enjoyed only moderate chart success, the song has remained a setlist staple for Heart consistently through the years.

Chart performance

References

External links
 

Heart (band) songs
1979 singles
Songs written by Sue Ennis
Songs written by Nancy Wilson (rock musician)
Songs written by Ann Wilson
1978 songs
Portrait Records singles
Songs about dogs
Song recordings produced by Mike Flicker